Gregor Želko (born 6 January 1994) is a footballer from Slovenia. He plays for Radomlje.

References

External links
 PrvaLiga profile 
 

1994 births
Living people
Slovenian footballers
Association football defenders
Association football midfielders
NK Domžale players